Jeevan (born Vijayabaskar Rangaraj) is an Indian Tamil film actor in the Tamil film industry. He first appeared in the film  University (2002). However, this was followed by greater success Kaakha Kaakha (2003). Following a 3-year sabbatical, he returned as an actor in the main role with Susi Ganesan's Thiruttu Payale (2006), which earned him praise. He signed up for the remake of the 1974 film Naan Avanillai (2007), and post-release gained even more praise for helping it become a success.

Biography

He graduated from the St Bede's School in Chennai. One of his classmates was actor Surya Sivakumar. He took up BA in Theatre Arts. He studied Theatre in London, and then took a 2½ years training in acting at the Stella Adler Studio of Acting in Hollywood. He worked as a bartender in a pub in East London called 'Weatherspoons'.

Career

He first appeared in the film University but remained largely unnoticed due to poor public opinion of the film. However, this was followed by greater success as Pandyaa in Kaakha Kaakha. Despite winning critical acclaim and receiving several offers to play the antagonist in Tamil films, Jeevan waited two years and opted against signing any more films since he wanted to play lead characters. In March 2005, he was offered the film Thotta directed by Selva and accepted to work on the film, though delays meant he had starred in other films as protagonist before it released.

Following a three-year hiatus, he returned as an actor in the main role with Susi Ganesan's Thiruttu Payale, which earned him praise. He signed up for the remake of the 1974 film Naan Avanillai, and post-release gained even more praise for helping it become a success. His recent releases include Thotta (co-starring Priyamani) and Machakaaran (opposite Kamna Jethmalani).His other ventures include Jeyikkira Kuthira and Asariri which are yet to be released. Paambattam is the recent film in his career which is still under production.

Filmography

References

External links 
 

Indian male film actors
Tamil male actors
Male actors in Tamil cinema
Living people
1975 births
Filmfare Awards South winners
International Tamil Film Award winners